Fighter Squadron 62 or VF-62 was an aviation unit of the United States Navy. Originally established on 1 July 1955 it was disestablished on 1 October 1969.

Operational history

VF-62 was assigned to Carrier Air Wing 8 (CVW-8) aboard the USS Shangri-La for a Mediterranean deployment from 15 November 1967 to 4 August 1968.

VF-62 and CVW-8 was embarked aboard the USS Shangri-La for a Caribbean deployment from October to December 1968.

Home port assignments
NAS Cecil Field

Aircraft assignment
FJ-3M Fury
F-8A/C/E Crusader

See also
History of the United States Navy
List of inactive United States Navy aircraft squadrons
List of United States Navy aircraft squadrons

References

External links

 Website of former squadronmembers

Strike fighter squadrons of the United States Navy